Fongum Gorji Dinka is a Cameroonian attorney, political activist, and Fon of the Widikum in northwestern Cameroon.

Biography 
Gorji Dinka was born on June 22, 1930. He was active in the Anglophone Crisis and advocated for more rights for Anglophone Cameroonians and against the Francophone government. He was the first president of the Cameroon Bar Association, and is also the named party of the Fongum Gorji Dinka v. Cameroon which was tried at the High Court of Justice and United Nations Human Rights Committee. Gorji Dinka also coined the place name Ambazonia, which he first used in 1984. Along with Bernard Fonlon and Carlson Anyangwe he authored 'The New Social Order' which claimed that the English-Speaking regions of Cameroons had the right to secede from Cameroon.

He was arrested in May 1985 for his protests against the government and was detained until February 1986. After his release, he escaped to Nigeria. In a 2005 judgment of the United Nations Human Rights ICCPR (International Covenant on Civil and Political Rights) Tribunal Communication 1134/2002, the United Nations Human Rights Tribunal ruled in favor of compensation for Fon Gorji-Dinka for human rights abuses to his person and for assurances of the enjoyment of his civil and political rights.

Bibliography

References 

1930 births
Living people
Widikum people
Cameroonian traditional rulers
Southern Cameroons
Cameroonian lawyers
Cameroonian activists
21st-century Cameroonian people
20th-century Cameroonian people
Cameroonian expatriates in Nigeria